The Archdiocese of Niamey is a Roman Catholic Archdiocese in Niger. It is based in the capital city of Niamey and was erected on 28 April 1942. Pope Benedict XVI made it an archdiocese in June 2007.

As of 2004, the diocese population was about 5,880,000 with 0.3% Catholic. 29 priests were in the Diocese for a ratio of 517 Catholics per Priest. Djalwana Laurent Lompo has been the head of the archdiocese since October 2014.

This archdiocese is the metropolitan of a province having one suffragan diocese: Maradi.

Bishops
Prefects Apostolic of Niamey
Fr. François Faroud, S.M.A. (1942-1948), appointed Prefect of Parakou, Dahomey (country since renamed Benin)
Fr. Constant Quillard, C.SS.R. (1948-1961)
''Bishops (later Archbishops) of Niamey
Marie-Jean-Baptiste-Hippolyte Berlier, C.SS.R. (1961-1984)
Guy Armand Romano, C.SS.R. (1997-2003)
Michel Christian Cartatéguy, S.M.A. (2003-2014), became Archbishop when see raised to Archdiocese in 2007
Djalwana Laurent Lompo (2014- )

Auxiliary Bishops
Michel Christian Cartatéguy, S.M.A. (1999-2003), appointed Bishop here
Djalwana Laurent Lompo (2013-2014), appointed Archbishop here
Ambroise Ouédraogo (1999-2001), appointed Bishop of Maradi

External links
 Profile of Niamey Archdiocese

Roman Catholic dioceses in Niger
Christian organizations established in 1942
Niamey
Roman Catholic dioceses and prelatures established in the 20th century
1942 establishments in the French colonial empire